Decatur County (county code DC) is a county located in Northwest Kansas. As of the 2020 census, the county population was 2,764. Its county seat and most populous city is Oberlin. The county is named in honor of Commodore Stephen Decatur, Jr.

History

Early history

For many millennia, the Great Plains of North America was inhabited by nomadic Native Americans.  From the 16th century to 18th century, the Kingdom of France claimed ownership of large parts of North America.  In 1762, after the French and Indian War, France secretly ceded New France to Spain, per the Treaty of Fontainebleau.

19th century
In 1802, Spain returned most of the land to France, but keeping title to about 7,500 square miles.  In 1803, most of the land for modern day Kansas was acquired by the United States from France as part of the 828,000 square mile Louisiana Purchase for 2.83 cents per acre.

In 1854, the Kansas Territory was organized, then in 1861 Kansas became the 34th U.S. state.  Decatur County was established March 20, 1873 and organized on December 15, 1879.  It is named for the Navy war hero Commodore Stephen Decatur, Jr., who served during the First Barbary War and the Second Barbary War and the War of 1812.

In 1878, the Sappa Creek valley in Decatur county was the scene of the last raid by Native Americans (Indians) in Kansas. In the Northern Cheyenne Exodus after the Battle of Punished Woman's Fork, a band of Cheyenne needing horses and provisions raged through the valley, killing more than 30 civilians and raping several woman. Several Cheyenne elderly, women, and children were also killed in the region by soldiers and civilians. In Oberlin, the Decatur County Last Indian Raid Museum commemorates the Cheyenne raid.

Geography

Adjacent counties
 Red Willow County, Nebraska (north)
 Furnas County, Nebraska (northeast)
 Norton County (east)
 Sheridan County (south)
 Thomas County (southwest)
 Rawlins County (west)

Demographics

As of the 2000 census, there were 3,472 people, 1,494 households, and 981 families residing in the county.  The population density was 4 people per square mile (2/km2).  There were 1,821 housing units at an average density of 2 per square mile (1/km2).  The racial makeup of the county was 97.87% White, 0.52% Black or African American, 0.09% Native American, 0.14% Asian, 0.12% Pacific Islander, 0.37% from other races, and 0.89% from two or more races. Hispanic or Latino of any race were 0.98% of the population.

There were 1,494 households, out of which 25.80% had children under the age of 18 living with them, 57.00% were married couples living together, 5.60% had a female householder with no husband present, and 34.30% were non-families. 32.80% of all households were made up of individuals, and 17.50% had someone living alone who was 65 years of age or older.  The average household size was 2.24 and the average family size was 2.83.

In the county, the population was spread out, with 23.60% under the age of 18, 4.70% from 18 to 24, 22.90% from 25 to 44, 22.60% from 45 to 64, and 26.20% who were 65 years of age or older.  The median age was 44 years. For every 100 females there were 97.50 males.  For every 100 females age 18 and over, there were 91.40 males.

The median income for a household in the county was $30,257, and the median income for a family was $34,982. Males had a median income of $25,139 versus $17,368 for females. The per capita income for the county was $16,348.  About 8.00% of families and 11.60% of the population were below the poverty line, including 17.20% of those under age 18 and 6.30% of those age 65 or over.

Government
Decatur county is heavily Republican. The last time a democratic candidate carried the county was in 1936 by Franklin D. Roosevelt.

Presidential elections

Laws
Following amendment to the Kansas Constitution in 1986, the county remained a prohibition, or "dry", county until 2002, when voters approved the sale of alcoholic liquor by the individual drink with a 30% food sales requirement.

Education

Unified school districts
 Oberlin USD 294

Communities

Cities
 Clayton
 Dresden
 Jennings
 Norcatur
 Oberlin

Unincorporated places
 Allison
 Cedar Bluffs
 Kanona
 Leoville
 Lyle
 Traer

Townships
Decatur County is divided into twenty-five townships.  The city of Oberlin is considered governmentally independent and is excluded from the census figures for the townships.  In the following table, the population center is the largest city (or cities) included in that township's population total, if it is of a significant size.

See also
National Register of Historic Places listings in Decatur County, Kansas

References

Further reading

 Handbook of Decatur County, Kansas; C.S. Burch Publishing Co; 25 pages; 1885.
 Standard Atlas of Decatur County, Kansas; Geo. A. Ogle & Co; 80 pages; 1921.
 Standard Atlas of Decatur County, Kansas; Geo. A. Ogle & Co; 69 pages; 1905.

External links

County
 
 Decatur County - Directory of Public Officials
Maps
 Decatur County Maps: Current, Historic, KDOT
 Kansas Highway Maps: Current, Historic, KDOT
 Kansas Railroad Maps: Current, 1996, 1915, KDOT and Kansas Historical Society

 
Kansas counties
1873 establishments in Kansas
Populated places established in 1873